Kirsty Jones is a Welsh professional kitesurfer and pioneer in the sport of kitesurfing. She is a three-time British Kitesurf Champion, three-time Kitesurf World Wave Champion, and two-time Master of the Ocean Champion, and holds world records in long distance and solo kitesurf crossings.

Born in Carmarthenshire, she made world headlines in 2002 when she was the first kitesurfer to cross the Irish Sea, in a charity solo event raising over £5,000 for the Ty Hafan Children's Hospice near Cardiff.

She first became UK Women's champion in 2002, and won the PKRA World Championship at the final 2008 event in Essaouira, Morocco.

She is sponsored by Animal, BWSURF, SUSO and SDF.

Trophies

Results of Kitesurf 2009 
Kitesurfing World Champion 2009

Master of the Ocean Champion

Results of Kitesurf 2008 
World Champion Kitesurf Wave

World Cup KPWT Wave Masters - Brazil - 1st

World Cup KPWT Wave Masters - France - 1st

World Cup KPWT - France - 1st

KPWT World Cup World Cup - Germany 1st

Results of kitesurf 2007 
Ladies British Kitesurfing Wave Champion

1st-Kitesurfing Wave Masters World Cup - Morocco

1st Kitesurfing World Cup - Portugal

Results of kitesurfing 2006 
1st - World Cup KPWT Wave Masters - Portugal

First crossing of Kitesurf in Charité Solo-Canary Islands in Morocco.

X-Fest Boarder Kitesurf Cross - 1st Lady

Ladies British Kitesurfing Wave Champion

Results of Kitesurf 2005 
Las Tres Islas (Quadrilateral Challenge of the Three Islands - 1st Lady

Red Bull Master of the Ocean Champion - Dominican Republic

Mondial Du Vent - International Kitesurfing Competition - 2nd Lady

Kitesurfing World Wave Champion - PKR - Brazil

Results of Kitesurf 2004 
PKRA Kiteboarding Coupé du Monde - Belgium - 2nd Lady

Beach Surf Competition

British Kite Board Tour - 1st Lady

Jinx Jam Contest - Senegal Africa - 1st Lady

Results of Kitesurf 2003 
British Kitesurfing Champion

British Kite-Board Tour Champion

Results of Kitesurf 2002 
First person forever Kitesurf from Ireland to Wales, Solo for charity.

Results of Kitesurf 2001 
British Kitesurfing Champion

Pro World Kite-board - Cornwall - 1st Lady

Windfest Contest Animal-Poole - 1st Lady

References

External links
Official website
Official Website of the PKRA World Kiteboarding Tour

1978 births
British kitesurfers
Female kitesurfers
Living people
People from Carmarthenshire
Welsh sportswomen